The men's 4 × 400 metres relay competition at the 2018 Asian Games took place on 29 and 30 August 2018 at the Gelora Bung Karno Stadium. Qatar won the gold medal for the first time in this event.

Schedule
All times are Western Indonesia Time (UTC+07:00)

Records

Results

Round 1
 Qualification: First 3 in each heat (Q) and the next 2 fastest (q) advance to the final.

Heat 1

Heat 2

Final

References

Relay 400 men
2018 400 men